The 7th British Academy Film Awards, given by the British Academy of Film and Television Arts in 1954, honoured the best films of 1953.

Winners and nominees

Best Film
 Jeux Interdits 
The Bad and the Beautiful
Come Back, Little Sheba
The Cruel Sea
Due soldi di speranza
From Here to Eternity
Genevieve
The Heart of the Matter
Julius Caesar
The Kidnappers
Lili
The Medium
Mogambo
Moulin Rouge
Nous sommes tous des assassins
Le Petit monde de Don Camillo
Roman Holiday
Shane
The Sun Shines Bright

Best Foreign Actor
 Marlon Brando in Julius Caesar 
Spencer Tracy in The Actress
Van Heflin in Shane
Eddie Albert in Roman Holiday
Gregory Peck in Roman Holiday
Claude Laydu in Journal d'un cure de campagne
Marcel Mouloudji in Nous sommes tous des assassins

Best British Actor
 John Gielgud in Julius Caesar 
Jack Hawkins in The Cruel Sea
Kenneth More in Genevieve
Trevor Howard in The Heart of the Matter
Duncan Macrae in The Kidnappers

Best British Actress
 Audrey Hepburn in Roman Holiday 
Celia Johnson in The Captain's Paradise

Best Foreign Actress
 Leslie Caron in Lili 
Shirley Booth in Come Back, Little Sheba
Maria Schell in The Heart of the Matter
Marie Powers in The Medium

Best Documentary
 The Conquest of Everest

Best British Film
 Genevieve 
The Cruel Sea
The Heart of the Matter
The Kidnappers
Moulin Rouge

Most Promising Newcomer To Film
 Norman Wisdom in Trouble in Store

United Nations Award
World Without End

Special Award
 The Romance of Transportation in Canada

References 

Film007
1953 film awards
1954 in British cinema